Portrait of an Assassin is a 1949 French film starring Maria Montez.

Plot
Christina (Montez) is the sadistic manager of a circus show, who uses her attractiveness to seduce men and force them to do dangerous acrobatic acts. One such lover, Eric (Von Stroheim), became handicapped.

Christina seduces Fabius (Brasseur) but his wife Martha (Arletty), turns up and performs the acrobatic act and dies. Fabius then murders Christina in revenge, does the act himself, survives and confesses.

Production
The movie was financed by a French furrier. It was originally announced that the film would be called Portrait of a Murderer and would star Maria Montez and Orson Welles. "Could be the battlingest picture of the century", wrote Hedda Hopper.

Orson Welles and Charles Lederer were meant to do some work on the film. The producer Jacques Gauthier sued them for $1 million each for non performance.

Reportedly Montez and Arletty feuded during filming causing retakes to be required.

References

External links 
 
Review of film at Variety

French black-and-white films
French thriller drama films
1940s thriller drama films
1949 drama films
Films directed by Bernard-Roland
1949 films
1940s French-language films
1940s French films